Jenő Hamburger (31 May 1883 – 14 December 1936) was a Hungarian politician of Jewish descent, who served as People's Commissar of Agriculture during the Hungarian Soviet Republic. He died in the Soviet Union where he worked as radiologist.

References
 Magyar Életrajzi Lexikon

1883 births
1936 deaths
People from Zalaszentgrót
People from the Kingdom of Hungary
Jewish Hungarian politicians
Jewish socialists
Social Democratic Party of Hungary politicians
Hungarian communists
Agriculture ministers of Hungary
Hungarian emigrants to the Soviet Union

People granted political asylum in the Soviet Union
Hungarian radiologists